Nate Turner (born May 28, 1969 in Chicago, Illinois) is a former American football running back who played for the Buffalo Bills and Carolina Panthers in the National Football League. He played college football at the University of Nebraska. He is currently running Nate Turner Receiving Academy in Chicago. He played tight end when he was with the Bills. In 1997, Turner represented the United States in rugby league at the World Sevens tournament in Sydney, Australia, with his size, speed and history in the NFL making him a major part of the event’s promotions.

1969 births
Living people
Players of American football from Chicago
American football running backs
American football tight ends
Nebraska Cornhuskers football players
Buffalo Bills players
Carolina Panthers players